Zara is an interchange station between Lines 3 and 5 of the Milan Metro. The station opened in 1995. It was the final stop on Line 3 until 2003, when Maciachini was opened.

It was the final stop on Line 5 and its only link to the rest of the network from the line's opening on 10 February 2013 until its extension to Porta Garibaldi on 1 March 2014.

The station is located on Viale Zara, in the municipality of Milan.

References

Line 3 (Milan Metro) stations
Line 5 (Milan Metro) stations
Railway stations opened in 1995
1995 establishments in Italy
Railway stations in Italy opened in the 20th century